Jenkinstown Park is a park in County Kilkenny, Ireland. It is situated off the N78 road about 10 km north of the city of Kilkenny and 11 km south of Castlecomer.

Facilities 
Facilities include a picnic site, forest walks, deer park and a craft centre. A small garden to commemorate Thomas Moore's association with the house has been laid down on the site of the old house. There are walks of between one and three kilometres through a plantation of mixed broadleaf and conifers.

History 
The park was formerly part of the old Bryan-Bellew Estate.

Flora
The main tree species in the park are beech, ash, oak, and Norway spruce. Some original park trees from the 1870s survive and include a number of rare species such as the Chinese necklace poplar, Populus lasiocarpa. A carpet of bluebells flowering in a beech and birch woods from mid April to late May is one of the special features of the park's other flora.

Fauna
The park is home to foxes, badgers, stoats, red and grey squirrels, and enclosed deer, as well as bats in the old church. Many species of birds – including pheasant, ravens, and the long-eared owl – inhabit the woods.

Geology 
Limestone, adjacent to Dunmore Caves.

References

External links 
 Jenkinstown Park - Discover Ireland
 Jenkinstown Park - Coillte

Forests and woodlands of the Republic of Ireland
Geography of County Kilkenny
Parks in County Kilkenny